Calle Zulueta follows the exterior line of the old defense wall of Havana, its route is affected by several inflections along the way. Running from its northern source at Calle Arsenal, it follows a slight incline to the southwest and heads south at the intersection with Calle Neptuno, then inclining to the south southeast at Calle Dragones. With a slight incline to the southwest, it heads south at the intersection with Calle Neptuno, then inclining to the south southeast at Calle Dragones. It marks one of the limits of the Parque Central, it extends by the Plaza hotel, and by the Museo Nacional de Bellas Artes (Trocadero, between Zulueta y Monserrate), Sloppy Joe's bar.

History

Calle Zulueta runs north from its southern intersection with Calle Cárcel north to the Havana Central railway station on Calle Arsenal. Calle Ignacio Agramonteis was its official name given in 1909, the locals to the present call it by the name it received in 1874: Calle Zulueta.

Its name honors of the potentate Don Julián de Zulueta, 1st Marquis of Álava, a colonel of the Volunteer Corps, president of the Spanish Casino, municipal deputy mayor, interim political governor on several occasions in which he rendered notable services to the city of Havana in terms of charity and public works. Julián Zulueta was a staunch defender of slave trafficking.

Places of interest
 Museum of the Revolution (Cuba)
 Museo Nacional de Bellas Artes de La Habana
 Parque Central, Havana
 Hotel Pasaje, Havana
 Plaza Hotel (Havana)
 Hotel Sevilla
 Sloppy Joe's Bar, Havana

Literature

The main character of Guillermo Cabrera Infante's La Habana para un infante difunto family moves to Calle Zulueta:

Gallery

See also

Julián de Zulueta, 1st Marquis of Álava
Havana Presidential Palace attack (1957)

Notes

References

External links
 Por Calle Zulueta hasta el Bacardì - La Habana
 Familias cubanas viven en un edificio declarado inhabitable en Zulueta
 La Habana para un Infante difunto: Cabrera Infante's Self Conscious Narrative

Archive of Historic Havana

Streets in Havana
Geography of Havana